Fosroc is a British manufacturer of specialised construction chemicals that cater to a range of sectors including commercial, industrial, residential, marine and infrastructure.

Fosroc has offices and manufacturing locations across Europe, the Middle East, North and South Asia. They are further represented in other regions around the world through a distributor and licensee network. Fosroc employs over 1,700 employees worldwide.

Notable projects

Rehabilitation of Asseyedah Fatimah Mosque
Location: Jeddah, Saudi Arabia

The mosque was Constructed 20 years ago, the reinforced concrete structure had severely deteriorated as a result of reinforcing steel corrosion in a highly aggressive environment. Fosroc Corrosion Solutions (FCS) technology was endorsed by the client as the right solution for the corrosion problem. This was designed to prevent future corrosion potentials and in turn, eliminate the need for future maintenance.

Burj Al Arab

Location: Dubai, UAE

Al Gurg Fosroc was required to work hand in hand with the contractors and other project consultants to identify the best product combinations that would provide optimal performance in difficult circumstances. The Burj Al Arab is the world's tallest hotel, constructed on a man-made island, surrounded by a seawater environment. Amongst a myriad of construction challenges, careful consideration needed to be given in the selection of concrete admixtures and products to provide waterproofing and pile heads.

Hyundai Mipo Shipyard

Location: Hyundai Mipo Dockyard, Ulsan, South Korea

Constructed in 1975, the Hyundai Mipo shipyard is among the world’s largest and most sophisticated shipyard facilities with a total area of 660,000 square metres. Fosroc Korea demonstrated the recommended solutions for each type of repair at the site. The various repair types included: building façade, rapid setting road repairs and extended-life repairs using anti-corrosion solutions.

St Helens Hospital Redevelopment

Location: Lancashire, England

The £338m project involved the construction of a new Diagnostic Treatment Centre extending the hospital site over challenging ground conditions. Fosroc worked closely with Project Manager, Taylor Woodrow Construction, Consultants Arup and Architects Capita to develop appropriate solutions from an early stage. Fosroc’s products provided waterproofing and gas protection. Design Manager, Clive Philips of Taylor Woodrow Construction said: “Fosroc UK’s design services and support have been really helpful”

History

References

Construction and civil engineering companies of the United Kingdom
Construction and civil engineering companies established in 1972
British companies established in 1972